Peter Phipps may refer to:
 Peter Phipps (admiral) (1916–1999), Royal New Zealand Navy officer
 Peter J. Phipps (born 1973), American judge
 Pete Phipps (born 1951), drummer, singer and songwriter